The Ghurid dynasty (also spelled Ghorids; ; self-designation: , Šansabānī) was a Persianate dynasty of presumably eastern Iranian Tajik origin, which ruled from the 10th-century to 1215. The Ghurids were centered in the hills of Ghor region in the present-day central Afghanistan, where they initially started out as local chiefs. They gradually converted to Sunni Islam from Buddhism after the conquest of Ghor by the Ghaznavid ruler Mahmud of Ghazni in 1011. The Ghurids eventually  overrun the Ghaznavids when Muhammad of Ghor seized Lahore and expelled the Ghaznavids from their last stronghold.

The Ghurids initially ruled as vassals of the Ghaznavids and later of the Seljuks. However, during the early twelfth century the long-standing rivalry between the Seljuks and Ghaznavids created a power vacuum in Khurasan which the Ghurids took advantage of and began their territorial expansion. Ala al-Din Husayn launched a devastating raid in the Ghaznavid territory and sacked their capital, although he was defeated by the Seljuks which, for a brief period of time, would halt the rapid Ghurid expansion.

However, under the diarchy of Alauddin nephews - Ghiyassuddin Ghuri and Muhammad of Ghor, the Ghurids reached zenith of their territorial expansion. While Ghiyasuddin was occupied with the Ghurid expansion in the west, his younger sibling Muhammad of Ghor along with his Turkic slave lieutenants began raiding in the east towards the Indian Subcontinent and by turn of the twelfth century swept down the lower Gangetic Plain and extended the Ghurid influence as far east as the Ganges delta in Bengal, while the Ghurids briefly reached as far as Gorgan (present-day Iran) in the west under Ghiyassuddin Ghuri.

Ghiyasuddin died in 1203 of illness and soon after the Ghurids suffered a catastrophe against the Qara Khitais (with the aid of the Khwarezmian Empire) in the Battle of Andkhud, fought on the banks of the Amu Darya in 1204. Muhammad was assassinated soon after in March 1206 on the bank of Indus, which effectively ended the Ghurid sovereignty as the subsequent rulers were vassalized by their Turkish rivals on the western frontier - the Khwrezmians under Muhammad II. The Ghurids continued to rule as their vassals, before they were overthrown in 1215, although their conquests in the Indian Subcontinent survived for several centuries under the evolving Delhi Sultanate established by the Ghurid Turk mamluk Qutb ud-Din Aibak.

Origins
In the 19th century some European scholars, such as Mountstuart Elphinstone, favoured the idea that the Ghurid dynasty was related to today's Pashtun people but this is generally rejected by modern scholarship and, as explained by Morgenstierne in the Encyclopaedia of Islam, is for "various reasons very improbable". Some scholars state that the dynasty was of Tajik origin.

Encyclopædia Iranica states: "Nor do we know anything about the ethnic stock of the Ḡūrīs in general and the Šansabānīs in particular; we can only assume that they were eastern Iranian Tajiks". Bosworth further points out that the actual name of the Ghurid family, Āl-e Šansab (Persianized: Šansabānī), is the Arabic pronunciation of the originally Middle Persian name Wišnasp.

Historian André Wink explains in The New Cambridge History of Islam:

When the Ghurids started to distinguish themselves through their conquests, courtiers and genealogists (such as Fakhr-i Mudabbir and al-Juzjani) forged a fictive genealogy which connected the Ghurids with the Iranian past. They traced the Ghurid family back to the mythical Arab tyrant Zahhak, mentioned in the medieval Persian epic  ("The Book of Kings"), whose family had reportedly settled in Ghur after the Iranian hero Fereydun had ended Zahhak's thousand-year tyranny.

Ghur remained primarily populated by Buddhists until the 11th century. It was then Islamised and gave rise to the Ghurids.

Language
The Ghurids' native language was apparently different from their court language, Persian. Abu'l-Fadl Bayhaqi, the famous historian of the Ghaznavid era, wrote on page 117 in his book Tarikh-i Bayhaqi: "Sultan Mas'ud I of Ghazni left for Ghoristan and sent his learned companion with two people from Ghor as interpreters between this person and the people of that region." However, like the Samanids and Ghaznavids, the Ghurids were great patrons of Persian literature, poetry, and culture, and promoted these in their courts as their own. Modern-day authors refer to them as the "Persianized Ghurids". Wink describes the tongue of the Ghurids as a "distinct Persian dialect".

There is nothing to confirm the recent conclusion that the inhabitants of Ghor were originally Pashto-speaking, and claims of the existence of "Pashto poetry", such as Pata Khazana, from the Ghurid period are unsubstantiated.

History

Early history

A certain Ghurid prince named Amir Banji was the ruler of Ghor and ancestor of the medieval Ghurid rulers. His rule was legitimized by the Abbasid caliph Harun al-Rashid.
Before the mid-12th century, the Ghurids had been bound to the Ghaznavids and Seljuks for about 150 years. Beginning in the mid-12th century, Ghor expressed its independence from the Ghaznavid Empire. In 1149 the Ghaznavid ruler Bahram-Shah of Ghazna poisoned a local Ghurid leader, Qutb al-Din Muhammad, who had taken refuge in the city of Ghazni after having a quarrel with his brother Sayf al-Din Suri. In revenge, Sayf marched towards Ghazni and defeated Bahram-Shah. However, one year later, Bahram returned and scored a decisive victory against Sayf, who was shortly captured and crucified at Pul-i Yak Taq. Baha al-Din Sam I, another brother of Sayf, set out to avenge the death of his two brothers, but died of natural causes before he could reach Ghazni. Ala al-Din Husayn, one of the youngest of Sayf's brothers and newly crowned Ghurid king, also set out to avenge the death of his two brothers. He managed to defeat Bahram-Shah, and then had Ghazni sacked; the city burned for seven days and seven nights. It earned him the title of Jahānsūz, meaning "the world burner". The Ghaznavids retook the city with Seljuq help, but lost it to Oghuz Turks.

In 1152, Ala al-Din Husayn refused to pay tribute to the Seljuks and instead marched an army from Firozkoh but was defeated and captured at Nab by Sultan Ahmed Sanjar. Ala al-Din Husayn remained a prisoner for two years, until he was released in return for a heavy ransom to the Seljuqs. Meanwhile, a rival of Ala al-Din named Husayn ibn Nasir al-Din Muhammad al-Madini had seized Firozkoh, but was murdered at the right moment when Ala al-Din returned to reclaim his ancestral domain. Ala al-Din spent the rest of his reign expanding the domains of his kingdom; he managed to conquer Garchistan, Tukharistan, and Bamiyan, and later gave Bamiyan and Tukharistan to Fakhr al-Din Masud, starting the Bamiyan branch of the Ghurids. Ala al-Din died in 1161, and was succeeded by his son Sayf al-Din Muhammad, who died two years later in a battle.

The Ghurids at their zenith

Sayf al-Din Muhammad was succeeded by his cousin Ghiyath al-Din Muhammad, who was the son of Baha al-Din Sam I, and proved himself to be a capable king. Right after Ghiyath's ascension, he, with the aid of his loyal brother Muhammad of Ghor (later known as "Shihabuddin Ghuri"), killed a rival Ghurid chief named Abu'l Abbas. Ghiyath then defeated his uncle Fakhr al-Din Masud who claimed the Ghurid throne and had allied with the Seljuq governor of Herat and Balkh.

In 1173, Muhammad of Ghor reconquered the city of Ghazni from the Ghuzz Turks after multiple attempts who deposed the Ghaznavids from there earlier. Afterwards, Muhammad assisted his brother Ghiyath in his contest with the Khwarezmian Empire for the lordship of Khorasan.

After the death of his brother Ghiyath on 13 March 1203, Muhammad became the successor of his empire and ruled until his assassination in 1206 near Jhelum by Ismāʿīlīs whom he persecuted during his lifetime.

Conquest of India and Bengal
 

On the eve of the Ghurid invasion of the subcontinent, Northern India was ruled by many independent Rajput kings, often fighting with each other, such as the Chahamana ruler Prithviraja III in Delhi and Ajmer, the Chaulukya ruler Mularaja II in Gujarat, the Gahadavala ruler Jayachandra in Kanauj, or the Sena ruler Lakshmana in Bengal. 

Northern India and Bengal were conquered by Muhammad of Ghor during the period from 1175 to 1205, just before his death in 1206. His capital was in Ghazni, while his elder brother Ghiyath al-Din Muhammad with whom Muhammad ruled in a diarchy, governed the western part of the empire from his capital at Fīrōzkōh. In 1175, Muhammad crossed the Indus River - approaching it through the Gomal Pass instead of Khyber Pass - likely to outflank the Ghazavids in Panjab and captured Multan from its Ismaili Muslim community, and also took Uch by 1176.

In 1178, he turned south and marched again via Gomal Pass into present-day Gujarat and Rajasthan through the Thar desert, where his armies got exhausted in their march and were routed in the Battle of Kasahrada fought near Mount Abu - south of Maruwar by a coalition of Rajput chiefs, which forced him to change his route for further inroads into India. Afterwards, Muhammad pressed upon the Ghanzavids, whose domain was considerably truncated, though they were still controlling parts of Punjab and Pakistan down to the valley of Kabul which were of strategic importance in the pathway to northern India. Thus, he conquered Peshawar and Sialkot and annexed their last principality in Punjab, with their capital in Lahore, in 1186 through strategem affer three raids.

In 1191, the Ghurids seized Bathinda and marched towards Delhi, but were defeated in the First Battle of Tarain by the Rajput confederacy led by the Ajmer-Chahamana king Prithviraja III. Nevertheless, Muhammad returned a year later with an army of Turkish mounted archers and routed the Rajput forces in the Second Battle of Tarain, and executed Prithviraja shortly afterwards. Govindaraja IV, son of Prithviraj Chauhan, submitted to the Ghurids the region of Ajmer, which became a vassal state. In 1193, Delhi was conquered by Mu'izz al-Din Muhammad's general Qutbu l-Din Aibak. The newly conquered territories were then put under the governorship of Qutb ud-Din Aibak, who was now Viceroy in Delhi.

In 1194, Muhammad returned to India and crossed the Jamuna with an army of 50,000 horses and at the Battle of Chandawar defeated the forces of the Gahadavala king Jayachandra, who was killed in action. After the battle, Muhammad continued his advance to the east, with his general Qutb ud-Din Aibak in the vanguard. The city of Benares (Kashi) was taken and razed, and "idols in a thousand temples" were destroyed. It is generally thought that the Buddhist city of Sarnath was also ravaged at that time. In 1196, Qutb ud-Din Aibak vanquished Sulakshanapala, the ruler of the Kachchhapaghata dynasty of Gwalior, capturing Gwalior fort. Also in 1196, Qutb ud-Din Aibak vanquished a coalition of the Rajputs of Ajmer and the Chaulukyas under king Bhima II at Mount Abu, thereafter sacking Anhilwara. 

In 1202-1203 CE, Qutbu l-Din Aibak, now Ghurid governor of Delhi, invaded the Chandela kingdom in the Ganges Valley. The Ghurids toppled local dynasties and destroyed Hindu temples during their advance across northern India, in place constructing mosques on the same sites.

Around 1203, Bakhtiyar Khalji, another Turkic general of Muhammad of Ghor, swept down the lower Gangetic Plain and into Bengal. In Bihar, he is said to have destroyed Buddhist centers of learning such as Nalanda University, greatly contributing to the decline of pre-Islamic Indic scholarship. In Bengal, he sacked the ancient city of Nudiya in central Bengal, and established an Islamic government in the former Sena capital of Lakhnauti in 1205.

Muhammad placed his faithful Turkic generals, rather than his own Ghurid brethens, in position of authority over local tributary kings, throughout the conquered Indian lands. After the death of Muhammad in early 1206, his territories fragmented into smaller Sultanates led by his former Mamluk generals. Taj-ud-Din Yildoz became the ruler of Ghazni. Nasir-ud-Din Qabacha became Sultan of Multan. Qutb ud-Din Aibak became Sultan of Delhi. Bakhtiyar Khilji became Sultan of Bengal, but was soon assassinated and succeeded by several Khalji rulers, until Bengal was incorporated into the Delhi Sultanate in 1227. Between 1206 and 1228 the various Turkic rulers and their successors rivaled for preeminence until the Sultan of Delhi Iltutmish prevailed, marking the advent of the Mamluk dynasty. This was the first dynasty of the Delhi Sultanate, which in total had five dynasties and would rule most of India for more than three centuries until the advent of the Mughal Empire in 1526.

Decline and fall

 
Ghiyath died on 13 March 1203 and was succeeded by Muhammad of Ghor as the sole ruler of the vast Ghurid Empire. Soonafter, Alauddin Khwarazm Shah besieged and captured some of the strongholds of the Ghurids around Merv, although Muhammad drove him back and further besieged their capital Gurgānj. However, Alauddin forces were supplemented by a large contingent from the Qara-Khitai rulers of Samarkand. In the ensuing battle Battle of Andkhud (1204), fought near the river Oxus, the Ghurid troops were completely routed by the combined forces of Qara Khitai and Kara-Khanid Khanate led by Tayangu of Taraz, and he himself escaped the debacle after paying huge ransom to Tayangu. The defeat at Andkhud was a watershed for the Ghurids who lost their control over most of the Khurasan. Notwithstanding, Muhammad within a year or so raised a vast army and build bridge across the Oxus to launch a full-scale invasion of Transoxiana to avenge his defeat. However, he was forced to move towards Punjab to crush a Khokhar rebellion whom he defeated and massacred in large number. On his way back, Muhammad of Ghor was assassinated near the Indus on March 15, 1206.

After the death of Muhammad Ghori in 1206, a confused struggle then ensued among the remaining Ghūrid leaders, and the Khwarezmians were able to take over the western part of the Ghūrid empire in about 1215. Though the Ghūrids' empire was short-lived, Mu'izz al-Din Muhammad's conquests strengthened the foundations of Muslim rule in India. On his death, and major defeats from Khwarazmian Empire and loss of Ghor and Ghazni, the capital was transferred to Delhi recognizing Khwarazmian rule on north and central Afghanistan. The Ghurids continued their rule on much of the Indian subcontinent, Sisitan region of Iran and south of Afghanistan.

Culture

The Ghurids were great patrons of Persian culture and literature and lay the basis for a Persianized state in the Indian subcontinent. However, most of the literature produced during the Ghurid era has been lost. They also transferred Iranian architecture to India. According to Amir Khusrau (died 1325), the Indians learned Persian because of the influence of the "Ghurids and Turks." The notion of Persian kingship served as the basis for the imperial formation, political and cultural unity of the Ghurids.

Out of the Ghurid state grew the Delhi Sultanate which established the Persian language as the official court language of the region – a status it retained until the late Mughal era in the 19th century.

There was a strong Turkic presence among the Ghurids, since Turk slave-soldiers formed the vanguard of the Ghurid armies. There was intense amalgamation between these various ethnic groups: "a notable admixture of Tajik, Persian, Turkish and indigenous Afghan ethnicities therefore characterized the Shansabanis". At least until the end of the 13th century when they ruled the Mamluk Sultanate in India, the Turks in the Ghurid realm maintained their ethnical characteristics, continuing to use Turkish as their main language, rather than Persian, and persisting in their rude and bellicose ways as "men of the sword", in opposition to the Persian "men of the pen".

List of rulers

Bamiyan Branch

Green shaded row signifies Ghurid vassalage under the Khwarazmian dynasty.

Ghurid family tree

See also
 History of Afghanistan
 List of battles involving the Ghurid dynasty

Notes

References

Bibliography 

 
 
  
 
 
 
 
 
 
 
 
 
 
 
 

 
1212 disestablishments in Asia
Empires and kingdoms of Iran
Ancient history of Pakistan